Santa Clara is a freguesia (civil parish) and district of Lisbon, the capital of Portugal. Located in northern Lisbon, Santa Clara is north of Lumiar, west of Olivais, and directly south of Lisbon's border with Odivelas and Loures. The population in 2011 was 22,480.

History
The freguesia was created with the 2012 Administrative Reform of Lisbon, merging the former Charneca and Ameixoeira parishes.

Landmarks
Igreja de Santana
Campo das Amoreiras

References

Parishes of Lisbon